Korenevo is the name of several inhabited localities in Russia.

Urban localities
Korenevo, Korenevsky District, Kursk Oblast, a work settlement in Korenevsky District of Kursk Oblast

Rural localities
Korenevo, Kaluga Oblast, a village in Zhizdrinsky District of Kaluga Oblast
Korenevo, Korenevsky Selsoviet, Korenevsky District, Kursk Oblast, a selo in Korenevsky Selsoviet of Korenevsky District of Kursk Oblast
Korenevo, Nizhny Novgorod Oblast, a village in Mezhdurechensky Selsoviet of Sokolsky District of Nizhny Novgorod Oblast
Korenevo, Omsk Oblast, a selo in Zalivinsky Rural Okrug of Tarsky District of Omsk Oblast
Korenevo, Pskov Oblast, a village in Pustoshkinsky District of Pskov Oblast
Korenevo, Ryazan Oblast, a village in Solominsky Rural Okrug of Klepikovsky District of Ryazan Oblast
Korenevo, Vologda Oblast, a village in Pudegsky Selsoviet of Vologodsky District of Vologda Oblast